The 1977–78 season was Chelsea Football Club's sixty-fourth competitive season.

Table

References

External links
 1977–78 season at stamford-bridge.com

1977–78
English football clubs 1977–78 season